Snake Den State Park is a public recreation area occupying  on U.S. Route 6 in the town of Johnston, Providence County, Rhode Island. The park includes a working farm, Dame Farm, and is largely undeveloped with limited recreational opportunities. The Rhode Island Division of Parks and Recreation is headquartered in the former, 22-room Palazzi family farmhouse. The park is named for a canyon-like fissure on the park grounds.

History
The farm was previously owned by the Steere and Dame families of Johnston. A Steere family cemetery lies within the park. The state purchased the property in 1969 from the Palazzi family, who had preserved the farm in a historic condition that dates back to the 18th century. The park was established to rescue open space in the greater Providence metropolitan area and to preserve part of the state's farming history. A 2005 plan by the state to develop a waterpark at the park was defeated by the citizens of Johnston over traffic concerns. Park plans call for the development of picnic areas and playing fields.

Recreation
The park is open year-round and features walking trails that provide visitors with opportunities to view the farm, foliage, and wildlife of the park.

References

External links
Snake Den State Park Rhode Island Department of Environmental Management Division of Parks & Recreation

State parks of Rhode Island
Protected areas of Providence County, Rhode Island
Protected areas established in 1969
1969 establishments in Rhode Island